Tom and His Pals is a 1926 American silent Western film directed by Robert De Lacey and starring Tom Tyler, Doris Hill and Frankie Darro. It was released in Britain under the alternative title of Movie Struck.

A film company comes to shoot their latest movie on a ranch.

Cast
 Tom Tyler as Tom Duffy 
 Doris Hill as Mary Smith 
 Frankie Darro as Frankie Smith 
 Dick Brandon as Junior Carroll 
 LeRoy Mason as Courtney 
 Helen Lynch as Pandora Golden

References

Citations

Sources
 Munden, Kenneth White. The American Film Institute Catalog of Motion Pictures Produced in the United States, Part 1. University of California Press, 1997.

External links
 

1926 films
1926 Western (genre) films
Films directed by Robert De Lacey
American black-and-white films
Film Booking Offices of America films
Films about filmmaking
Silent American Western (genre) films
1920s English-language films
1920s American films